Gmul ('Recompense') was a short-lived secret unit created in the Jewish Brigade in 1945 at the end of World War II to identify and kill Germans, particularly SS members, who had taken part in atrocities against Jews.

See also 

 Nakam

References

1945 in Europe
Jewish Brigade

Nazi hunters